Villa Negrita Airport  is a public use airstrip near Villa Negrita in the Beni Department of Bolivia. Villa Negrita is a ranching region of Yacuma Province, south of Lake Guachuna in the Bolivian pampa.

See also

Transport in Bolivia
List of airports in Bolivia

References

External links 
OpenStreetMap - Villa Negrita
OurAirports - Villa Negrita

Airports in Beni Department